Siamak Hariri, OAA, AAA, AIBC, FRAIC, RCA, Intl. Assoc. AIA (born 1958) is a Canadian architect and a founding partner of Hariri Pontarini Architects, a full-service architectural and interior design practice based in Toronto, Canada.  

Born in Bonn, Germany, Hariri was educated at the University of Waterloo (BES, '79) and Yale University (M.Arch, '85). Upon graduation, he worked at firms in New York and Toronto before founding Hariri Pontarini Architects with David Pontarini in 1994. Hariri holds "deep respect for the transformative potential of architecture and specializes in designing works of enduring value" for private and public clients including the Art Gallery of Ontario, Royal Ontario Museum, Princess Margaret Cancer Centre, and St. Michael's Hospital.

Hariri is a member of the Royal Canadian Academy of Arts, sits on the board of the Design Exchange, and has sat on the advisory board of the Royal Ontario Museum's Contemporary Culture (formerly the Institute for Contemporary Culture) and the Toronto Community Foundation. He served as a member of Waterfront Toronto's Design Review Panel from 2005 until 2010. Hariri has also taught studios at the John H. Daniels Faculty of Architecture, Landscape and Design at the University of Toronto. He has been a lecturer, guest critic, and jury member for organizations across North America and Europe. 

He lives in Toronto with his wife, artist Sasha Rogers, and their three children.

Design Approach 
In his TED Talk entitled How do you build a sacred space, Hariri shared that the inspiration behind his practice stems from the emotional response that architecture can create: "The school of architecture that I studied at some 30 years ago happened to be across the street from the wonderful art gallery designed by the great architect Louis Kahn. I love the building, and I used to visit it quite often. One day, I saw the security guard run his hand across the concrete wall. And it was the way he did it, the expression on his face—something touched me. I could see that the security guard was moved by the building and that architecture has that capacity to move you. I could see it, and I remember thinking, 'Wow. How does architecture do that?' At school, I was learning to design, but here—here was a reaction of the heart. And it touched me to the core. You know, you aspire for beauty, for sensuousness, for atmosphere, the emotional response. That's the realm of the ineffable and the immeasurable. And that's what you live for: a chance to try."

Over the past three decades, Hariri has established a reputation as a "sculptor working in architecture." His work reflects a commitment to the essentials of architecture, and to every project he brings "a profound interest in light, form, site, material, and craft." His process begins with hand-sketching to establish the initial conceptual design for a project, which is then refined and developed in an iterative process of additional sketching, physical model studies, and digital renderings.

Honours
Hariri's portfolio has been honored with over 60 national and international design awards, including three Governor General's Medals in Architecture. With founding partner, David Pontarini, the firm received the 2013 Royal Architectural Institute of Canada's Architectural Firm Award. 

In 2014, Hariri was named a Fellow of the Royal Architectural Institute of Canada.

For his contributions to architecture in Canada and abroad, Hariri received an honorary Doctor of Architecture from Ryerson University in 2017.  

In 2016, Hariri presented a TED Talk about the Bahá'í Temple of South America that has since garnered over 1.4 million views.  

The Globe and Mail listed Hariri as one of Canada's most remarkable artists.

Notable projects

McKinsey & Company Toronto Headquarters 
One of Hariri's earliest commissions, the Canadian headquarters of McKinsey & Company, received a City of Toronto heritage designation just five years after completion. Located at Victoria University in the University of Toronto's campus, the building harmonizes campus planning traditions with innovative office design to establish a culture of collaboration and excellence. The design reimagines the conventional office structure by implementing a new planning model called "The Hive," a dynamic, three-storey gathering space that blends light, form, and material.

Schulich School of Business, York University 
The Governor General's Medal-winning Schulich School of Business for York University was completed in 2003 in joint venture with Robbie/Young + Wright Architects. The 340,000 square foot building, which spans a full city block, integrates an educational facility with luxury residential dwellings in a corporate learning complex. An early example of Hariri's high attention to detail and craftsmanship, the project was the first time the firm used a custom curtain wall system designed in collaboration with the manufacturer.

Richard Ivey Building, Western University 
In 2009, Hariri's design won an international competition as the new home of the Ivey Business School at Western University. The design concept for the building emulates a geode. The research-based design process involved workshops and a survey of top business schools, with careful attention paid to the design of the case study classrooms and breakout rooms essential to Ivey's case method of learning. The project has been recognized with several awards including the 2016 Chicago Athenaeum International Architecture Award, 2016 American Institute of Architects' Educational Facility Design Award of Excellence, and the 2016 Ontario Association of Architects' Lieutenant Governor of Ontario's Award for Design Excellence in Architecture.

Bahá'í Temple of South America 
Hariri was the Partner-in-Charge and lead designer of the acclaimed Bahá'í Temple of South America in Santiago, Chile. Completed in 2016, it is the last of eight continental temples commissioned by the Bahá'í community. Hariri's design was selected through an international design competition with 180 entries from 80 countries. The project is celebrated for its complex design and construction as well as innovations in structure, material, and technology. Following the completion of the temple, Birkhäuser published Embodied Light - Bahá'í Temple of South America, a book that highlights the technological innovation and architectural excellence of the project spanning its 14-year journey. 

In 2019, the Temple was the first project by a Canadian firm to win the RAIC International Prize—a biennial award that recognizes a single work of architecture that creates lasting transformation within its societal context. The jury report noted, "The architects resolve a challenging and prescriptive program for a new Bahá'í Temple near Santiago with a powerful form that creates a new landmark - a jewel - in a dramatic natural setting. One juror compared the sight of the temple in the distance to a visitor's first glimpse of Ronchamp, creating a sense of procession and heightened anticipation in the experience of approach and arrival." 

Hariri has mentioned that the Temple was "the project of a lifetime," noting his personal connection as a member of the Bahá'í community.

Casey House 
In 2017, Hariri completed the renovation and extension to Casey House, a specialized hospital for people living with HIV/AIDS in Toronto. The 'embrace' was the central concept for the design and is reflected in the building's architectural form and home-like user environment. The façade of the new addition consists of an arrangement of tinted glass, brick, and stone, inspired by the AIDS quilt. The project has received a 2018 Governor General's Medal in Architecture, 2018 Ontario Association of Architects' Design Excellence Award, and 2019 AIA/AAH Healthcare Design Award, among others, for its high design and compassionate approach to healthcare.

Tom Patterson Theatre, Stratford Festival 
In 2016, Hariri was invited to participate in a design competition to reimagine the Stratford Festival's Tom Patterson Theatre from a pool of over 50 international architects. His winning design "advances the art and possibility of performance with a building designed to attract, engage and connect." The curvilinear building blends into the riverside setting and blurs the boundary of indoors and out. Naturally lit lobby and lounge areas wrap the intimate, 600-seat auditorium, which features an elongated thrust stage. Upon project completion, Alex Bozikovic, architecture critic of The Globe and Mail wrote, "this facility for the Stratford Festival is a remarkable piece of design, joining technically advanced facilities with some of the most beautifully detailed and well-sited public rooms in the country. It is a rare case in which a Canadian institution demanded excellent design, paid for it, and actually followed through." International acclaim for the project includes a "Best of the Best Award" in Cultural Architecture from the 2021 Architecture MasterPrize. It is also a Regional Finalist for the 2022 Civic Trust Awards.

Other completed projects
Hariri's body of work focuses on institutional projects and private residences. He was the Partner-in-Charge for the following selection of projects:

 2021: Nicol Building, Sprott School of Business, Carleton University, Ottawa, Ontario, Canada
 2021: BARLO MS Centre, St. Michael's Hospital, Toronto, Ontario, Canada 

2019: Rankin Family Pavilion, Brock University, St. Catharines, Ontario, Canada
2018: Essex Centre of Research, University of Windsor, Ontario, Canada
2016: Jackman Law Building, University of Toronto Faculty of Law, Toronto, Ontario, Canada
2014: Lake Huron Residence, Lake Huron, Ontario, Canada
2011: Michael G. DeGroote School of Medicine, McMaster University, Kitchener, Ontario, Canada
2010: Art Gallery of Ontario, The Weston Family Learning Centre, Toronto, Ontario, Canada
2010: The Ontario Pavilion for Vancouver 2010 Winter Olympic Games, Vancouver, British Columbia, Canada
2009: Max Gluskin House, Department of Economics, University of Toronto, Ontario, Canada
2008: University of Waterloo School of Pharmacy, Kitchener, Ontario, Canada
2006: Ravine Residence, Toronto, Ontario, Canada
2004: Art Collectors' Residence, Toronto, Ontario, Canada
2001: MacLaren Art Centre, Barrie, Ontario, Canada
1998: Robertson House Crisis Care Centre, Toronto, Ontario, Canada

Notable press and publications

 Lam, Elsa. "Stage by Stage: Tom Patterson Theatre, Stratford, Ontario." Canadian Architect, November 2021 
 Immen, Wallace. "Carleton's new business school embodies intimacy and belonging." The Globe and Mail, September 2021 
 Novakovic, Stefan. "A Thousand Moments of Care: Siamak Hariri on Creating Healing Spaces." AZURE, April 2021 
 Bozikovic, Alex. "Stratford's new Tom Patterson Theatre deserves a standing ovation." The Globe and Mail, October 2020 
 Lam, Elsa. "Editorial: Crafting a Jewel." Canadian Architect, December 2019 
 Novakovic, Stefan. "Coming Home: Case House, Toronto, Ontario." July 2018 
 "Extension of a Medical Centre: Casey House." The Plan, April 2018 
 "Embodied Light: The Baha'i Temple of South America." Birkhauser Publishing, 2018 
 Bozikovic, Alex. "A hospital shows the medicinal power of light, beauty and dignity." The Globe and Mail, October 2017 
 Lewsen, Simon. "How a Toronto Firm Took on the Architecture World and Won." Sharp Magazine, July 2016 
 Weder, Adele. "Ivey League Ideals." Canadian Architect, July 2014 
 Hariri, Siamak. "Falling Backwards: The Design Process Unveiled." Practices (Journal of the Centre for the Study of Practice), Spring 2006 
 Kelmans, Marsha. "Temple of Light." Canadian Architect, May 2004

References 

Canadian architects
Yale School of Architecture alumni

1958 births
Living people